Álvaro Magalhães (born 1951 in Porto) is a Portuguese writer. In 1982 he published his first book, História com muitas letras. Since then, Álvaro Magalhães wrote many other stories. His most prominent work, in literature, however, is the series of books Triângulo Jota. These books are about three children, Jorge, Joana and Joel who solve crimes with paranormal contours.
Álvaro Magalhães also received the award Grande Prémio Calouste Gulbenkian de Literatura para Crianças e Jovens 2002 for his book Hipopóptimos – Uma História de Amor.

References 

1951 births
People from Porto
Portuguese male writers
Living people